Tessa Jillian Florio-Gavilsky (born July 20, 1989) is an American soccer forward. She played soccer at Stetson from 2007 to 2010.

References

External links 
 

1989 births
Living people
American women's soccer players
Kokkola Futis 10 players
IK Sirius Fotboll players
Mallbackens IF players
Damallsvenskan players
American expatriate sportspeople in Sweden
Expatriate women's footballers in Sweden
Women's association football forwards
Houston Dash players
National Women's Soccer League players
Stetson Hatters women's soccer players
Ottawa Fury (women) players
USL W-League (1995–2015) players
American expatriate sportspeople in Canada
Expatriate women's soccer players in Canada
American expatriate sportspeople in Finland
Expatriate women's footballers in Finland